The European Union Referendum (Date of Referendum etc.) Regulations 2016 (No. 278) is a Statutory Instrument of the Parliament of the United Kingdom that made legal provision under the provisions of the European Union Referendum Act 2015 for the nationwide referendum to be held across the United Kingdom and Gibraltar on the issue of continued membership to the European Union on the appointed day of Thursday 23 June 2016 with a ten-week  campaigning period leading up to date of the poll to begin on Friday 15 April 2016 and end on Polling day. The Statutory Instrument was made following the Conservative Prime Minister David Cameron's official announcement on Saturday 20 February 2016 in Downing Street that the referendum was to be held on that date and came into force on 4 March 2016.

See also
 2016 United Kingdom European Union membership referendum
 The European Union Referendum (Conduct) Regulations 2016
 European Union Referendum Act 2015

References

Statutory Instruments of the United Kingdom
2016 in British law
2016 United Kingdom European Union membership referendum
Referendums in the United Kingdom